The name Japanese beech can refer to two different species of beech tree, both native to Japan.
Fagus crenata, also called Siebold's beech, (ブナ, buna in Japanese)
Fagus japonica, also called Japanese blue beech (イヌブナ, inubuna or kurobuna in Japanese)